Don Donaghy (born Leonard Donald Donaghy in Pennsylvania; 2 November 1936 – 23 July 2008) was a member of the New York school of photography.

Donaghy studied at the Philadelphia Museum School of Art after which he pursued street photography in Philadelphia and New York City using a Leica 35mm camera. His first exhibition Two Young Philadelphians: Don Donaghy & George Krause, was held in 1962. Donaghy's first published work was a re-creation of this exhibition in the Fall 1962 issue of Contemporary Photographer, titled same as the show.

The landmark exhibition and publication The New York School, Photographs 1936-63, by Jane Livingston, includes a selection of Donaghy's photographs. Donaghy is featured in "The Last Photographic Heroes: American Photographers of the Sixties and Seventies", by Gilles Mora.

In addition to photography, Donaghy worked as a film editor and a cameraman. While living in Boulder, CO, he was also a construction foreman. He died on July 23, 2008.

Publications with contributions by Donaghy
The New York School, Photographs 1936-63. . By Jane Livingston.
The Last Photographic Heroes: American Photographers of the Sixties and Seventies. . By Gilles Mora.

Exhibitions 
 Three Photographers: Nicholas Dean, Bill Hanson, Don Donaghy (Rochester, NY, Aug 21 to Oct 21, 1963)
 Photography 63/An International Exhibition (Syracuse NY, Rochester NY and Fort Wayne IN, August 1963 to February 1964)(George Eastman House database)
 Six Photographers I (Contemporary Photographers I) (Rochester NY, 1964)(George Eastman House database)
 Photographs Do Not Bend Past Show Listing (Oct 27 to Dec 2, 2000 show with Keith Carter)
 Gallery Sink, Previous Exhibitions (Sep 27 to Nov 29, 2002 group show)
 Hemphill Fine Arts Exhibition Archive (2006 show with Benjamin Abramowitz and William Christenberry)
 Yancey Richardson Gallery > Past Exhibitions > 2006 (Oct 27 to Nov 25, 2006 show)
 Chance Encounters: Photographs from the Collection of Norman Carr and Carolyn Kinder Carr ([Corcoran Gallery of Art], 2008)
 Street Seen: The Psychological Gesture in American Photography, 1940–1959, Milwaukee Art Museum, 2010

Collections
Donaghy's work is held in the following permanent collections:
Corcoran Gallery of Art
Museum of Modern Art
George Eastman House
New York Public Library
Hallmark Photographic Collection
Metropolitan Museum of Art
San Francisco Museum of Modern Art
Museum of Fine Arts, Houston
Smithsonian American Art Museum

References

External links 

20th-century American photographers
Street photographers
2008 deaths
University of the Arts (Philadelphia) alumni
1936 births
Artists from Pennsylvania